The 20 Greatest Christmas Songs is a compilation/remix album by Boney M. In 1986 producer Frank Farian took the master tapes from 1981's Christmas Album, added six recordings by Liz Mitchell, Reggie Tsiboe and two session singers from 1984, remixed them and created Die 20 schönsten Weihnachtslieder der Welt, internationally released as The 20 Greatest Christmas Songs. The 1986 version of the Boney M. Christmas album has since been re-issued as The Most Beautiful Christmas Songs of the World (1992),  A Wonderful Christmas Time (1998) and Christmas Party (1998 and 2003).

Track listing

Side A
"Christmas Medley ("Silent Night, Holy Night" / "Snow Falls Over the Ground" / "Hear Ye the Message" / "Sweet Bells") (Franz Xaver Gruber, Joseph Mohr, Farian, Jay)  - 7:51
 Full-length version including the previously unreleased "Sweet Bells". Features Amy & Elaine Goff singing the first verse of "Silent Night, Holy Night" in German - instead of Liz Mitchell singing the first verse in English.
"Oh Christmas Tree" ("O Tannenbaum") (Ernst Anschütz, Farian) - 2:54
"Hark the Herald Angels Sing" (Felix Mendelssohn, Charles Wesley, Farian)  - 3:03
"Zion's Daughter" (George Frideric Handel, Traditional, Farian, Jay, Rulofs) - 3:50
"The First Noel" (Traditional) - 3:03
"Oh Come All Ye Faithful" (John Francis Wade, Farian)  - 3:41
"Petit Papa Noël" (Martinet, Vincy)  - 1:41
"Darkness Is Falling" (Jay, Rulofs)  - 3:02

Side B
"Joy to the World" (Lowell Mason, Isaac Watts)  - 2:32
"White Christmas" (Irving Berlin) - 3:21
 Edited version
"Jingle Bells" (James Lord Pierpont, Farian)  - 3:28
"Feliz Navidad" (José Feliciano) - 2:21
"When a Child Is Born" (Jay, Zacar) - 3:19
"Little Drummer Boy" (Katherine K. Davis, Henry Onorati, Harry Simeone)  - 4:21
"Mary's Boy Child - Oh My Lord" (Jester Hairston, Farian)  - 5:09
 Edited version
"Auld Lang Syne" (Robert Burns, Traditional)  - 2:34

Personnel
 Liz Mitchell - lead vocals (except trk. A2, A5, A6, B1, B8), backing vocals
 Marcia Barrett - backing vocals (track B3, B4, B7)
 Frank Farian - backing vocals
 Reggie Tsiboe - lead vocals, backing vocals (tracks A2, A5, A6, B1 & B8)
 London Christmas Choir - choir (tracks A1, A5, A7, A8, B2, B5 & B6)
 Amy & Elaine Goff - lead- and backing vocals (tracks A1, A2, A3, A5, A6, B1 & B8)
 London Philharmonic Orchestra - orchestra

Production
 Frank Farian - producer, remixer

Release history
 Germany 1986: Die 20 Schönsten Weihnachtslieder der Welt Hansa Records 208 018-630, LP
 Germany 1986: Die 20 Schönsten Weihnachtslieder der Welt Hansa Records 258 018-225, CD
 Germany 1986: Die 20 Schönsten Weihnachtslieder der Welt Hansa Records 408 018-270, CASS
 CANADA 1986: The 20 Greatest Christmas Songs Ariola 258 018, CD
 CANADA 1995: The 20 Greatest Christmas Songs Ariola 258 018, CD, RE-Issue
 CANADA 1986: The 20 Greatest Christmas Songs Ariola 408 018, CASS
 EU 1986: The 20 Greatest Christmas Songs Hansa 208 116-320, LP
 EU 1986: The 20 Greatest Christmas Songs Hansa 258 116-200, CD
 Indonesia 1986: Die 20 Schönsten Weihnachtslieder der Welt Hansa 408 018-501, CASS

References

External links
 Rate Your Music, detailed discography
 Discogs.com, detailed discography
 [ Allmusic, biography, discography etc.]

1986 compilation albums
1986 Christmas albums
Boney M. compilation albums
Albums produced by Frank Farian
Christmas albums by German artists
Christmas compilation albums
Disco compilation albums
Hansa Records compilation albums